Ebony and Ivory Ridge is a coastal ridge  long between Airdrop Peak and Mount Robert Scott at the northern end of the Commonwealth Range in Antarctica. It consists of dark metamorphosed greywacke contrasting sharply with the predominant brown ochre of the weathered surface of the granitic intrusions forming nearby Mount Kyffin and Mount Harcourt. It was descriptively named by the New Zealand Alpine Club Antarctic Expedition, 1959–60.

References 

Ridges of the Ross Dependency
Dufek Coast